Wedding Dash is a series of strategy casual video games by PlayFirst.  It was released on October 18, 2007 as a spin-off to the Diner Dash series of games.

Plot
The player plays as Quinn, a hopeful wedding planner. In every level, the player assists the couple in selecting all the details such as the food, the honeymoon, etc. Once the couple has taken their vows, the player has to look out for obstacles that can wreck their perfect wedding party. There are two modes in this game, similar to Diner Dash: "Career Mode" and "Endless Reception". In Career Mode, the player must pay attention to their clients' wishes (the bride and groom) for the food, honeymoon destination, flowers, and cake. The wedding planner (Quinn) must also prevent the bride and groom from seeing any of the disasters that could or are happening at the wedding. In the Endless Reception mode, the player can make the reception last as long as possible without the bride getting angry and turning into a bridezilla (similar to Bruce Banner becoming The Incredible Hulk). Once the bride turns into a bridezilla, the game ends.

Games

Wedding Dash

Wedding Dash 2: Rings Around the World
In this sequel, there are some changes from the original. The player alternates between Quinn the wedding planner and Joe the photographer. Besides having to keep the bride and groom from seeing any of the disasters that could be or are happening at the wedding, the player must also have the photographer take pictures of the guests. In the "Endless Reception" mode, the player must make the wedding last as long as possible before the groom gets angry and turns into Groom Kong. Once the groom turns into Groom Kong, the game is over.

In the game's story, Quinn is invited by Mr. Bigger, the owner of hotel chains around the world to participate in a competition to select the best wedding planner to plan Mr. Bigger's daughter's wedding.  The player goes to five scenic locations around the world: the Niagara Falls, the Amazon Rainforest, the Arabian Desert, an ice resort in Finland, and the royal resort in Thailand.  Quinn finds out one of the competitors is cheating and that Mr. Bigger's daughter has fallen in love with her photographer,  Joe.

Wedding Dash: Ready, Aim, Love!
In this Wedding Dash, drawings have changed a small bit, and now the player has a budget to stick to when choosing decor and cakes. In this game, Cupid has several people to shoot before the end of the year or he is out of the job. Along with this, Quinn decides to help Cupid in order for him to shoot Joe, the photographer, so he will propose and Quinn can finally begin planning her own wedding. At the end of the first ten levels, Cupid reveals that he has been trying to shoot Flo for months. But at the end of fourth level Quinn gets sneaky and rejects Joe although she still loves him. The game ends with Cupid shooting his arrow at birds.

Wedding Dash 4-Ever
With the wedding between Joe and Quinn off, Quinn is planning the next reception when her mother stops by. She doesn't know that the wedding has been called off, and plans to help Quinn with her wedding. Can Quinn break the news to her?

In this game, the player also helps with the seating at the Wedding Ceremony, and leads the after-reception conga line. The player also has to help the newlyweds find things they have misplaced, and in return they will give the player a small token of their gratitude: a wedding present. The game ends with a surprise by Quinn's father as he and Lynn renew their vows on an anniversary bonus level. At the very end, Joe says he imagines his own wedding with Quinn like this when he sees Quinn's mother and father walking down the aisle. Quinn is also holding his hand while he says it.

References

External links 
 Wedding Dash official site
 Wedding Dash 2 official site

2007 video games
Casual games
BlackBerry games
IOS games
MacOS games
Mobile games
Nintendo DS games
Video games featuring female protagonists
Games built with Playground SDK
Works about wedding
Windows games
Video game franchises
Video games developed in the United States
PlayFirst games